Victory City may refer to: 

 Ciudad de Victoria, a  tourism enterprise zone in the Philippines
 Victory City, Texas, an unincorporated community in Texas
 Victory City (novel), a 2023 novel by Salman Rushdie